Ken Rex McElroy (June 1, 1934 – July 10, 1981) was an American criminal and convicted attempted murderer who resided in Skidmore, Missouri, United States. He was known as "the town bully", and his unsolved killing became the focus of international attention. Over the course of his life, McElroy was accused of dozens of felonies, including assault, child molestation, statutory rape, arson, animal cruelty, hog and cattle rustling, and burglary.

In all, he was indicted 21 times but escaped conviction each time, except for the last. In 1981, McElroy was convicted of attempted murder in the shooting of the town's 70-year-old grocer Ernest "Bo" Bowenkamp. McElroy successfully appealed the conviction and was released on bond, after which he engaged in an ongoing harassment campaign against Bowenkamp and others who were sympathetic to Bowenkamp, including the town's Church of Christ minister. He appeared in a local bar, the D&G Tavern, armed with an M1 Garand rifle and bayonet, and later threatened to kill Bowenkamp. The next day, McElroy was shot to death in broad daylight as he sat with his wife Trena in his pickup truck on Skidmore's main street. He was struck by bullets from at least two different firearms, in front of a crowd of people estimated as numbering between 30 and 46. To date, no one has been charged in connection with McElroy's death.

Early life
McElroy was born in 1934, the 15th of 16 children born to a poor, migrant tenant-farming couple named Tony and Mabel (née Lister) McElroy, who had moved between Kansas and the Ozarks before settling outside of Skidmore. He dropped out of school at age 15 in the eighth grade and quickly established a local reputation as a cattle rustler, small-time thief, and womanizer. For more than two decades, McElroy was suspected of being involved in theft of grain, gasoline, alcohol, antiques, and livestock, but he avoided conviction when charges were brought against him 21 times—often after witnesses refused to testify because he allegedly intimidated them, frequently by following his targets or parking outside their homes and watching them. He was represented by defense attorney Richard Gene McFadin of Gallatin, Missouri.

McElroy fathered more than 10 children with different women. He met his last wife, Trena McCloud (1957–2012), when she was 12 years old and in eighth grade. He raped McCloud repeatedly. The 12-year-old's parents initially opposed the relationship, but after McElroy burned their house down and shot the family dog, they relented and agreed to the marriage. She became pregnant when she was fourteen, dropped out of school in the ninth grade, and went to live with McElroy and his second wife Alice. McElroy divorced Alice and married Trena in order to escape charges of statutory rape, to which she was the only witness. Sixteen days after Trena gave birth, both she and Alice fled to Trena's mother's and stepfather's house. According to court records, McElroy tracked them down and brought them back. He then returned to Trena's parents' home when they were away and, once again, shot the family dog and burned the house down.

Events prior to his killing
Based on Trena's story, McElroy was indicted in June 1973 for arson, assault, and statutory rape. He was arrested, booked, arraigned, and released on $2,500 bail. Trena and her baby were placed in foster care at a home in Maryville, Missouri. McElroy sat outside the foster home for hours at a time staring at it. He told the foster family that he would trade "girl for girl" to get his child back, since he knew where the foster family's biological daughter went to school and what bus route she rode. Additional charges were filed against McElroy.

On July 27, 1976, Skidmore farmer Romaine Henry said McElroy shot him twice with a shotgun after Henry challenged him for shooting weapons on Henry's property. McElroy was charged with assault with intent to kill. McElroy denied he was at the scene. As the case dragged on without a court date, Henry said McElroy had parked outside his home at least 100 times. At the trial, two raccoon hunters testified they were with McElroy the day of the shooting away from Henry's property. Henry was forced to admit in court, under questioning by McElroy's attorney Richard Gene McFadin, that he had concealed his own petty criminal conviction from more than 30 years previous. McElroy was acquitted.

1981 killing

In 1980, one of McElroy's children got into an argument with a clerk, Evelyn Sumy, in a local grocery store owned by 70-year-old Ernest "Bo" Bowenkamp and his wife Lois, allegedly because the young McElroy child tried to steal some candy. McElroy began stalking the Bowenkamp family, and eventually threatened Bo Bowenkamp in the back of his store with a shotgun in hand. In the ensuing confrontation, McElroy shot Bowenkamp in the neck; Bowenkamp survived, and McElroy was arrested and charged with attempted murder. McElroy was convicted at trial of assault, but freed on bail pending his appeal. Immediately after being released at a post-trial hearing, McElroy went to the D&G Tavern, a local bar, with an M1 Garand rifle with a bayonet attached, and made graphic threats about what he would do to Bo Bowenkamp. This led to several patrons deciding to see what they could legally do to prevent McElroy from harming anyone else. Nodaway County Sheriff Dan Estes suggested they form a neighborhood watch.

McElroy's appeal hearing was again delayed. On the morning of July 10, 1981, townspeople met at the Legion Hall in the center of town with Sheriff Estes to discuss how to protect themselves. During the meeting, McElroy arrived at the D&G Tavern with Trena. As he sat drinking at the bar, word got back to the men at the Legion Hall that he was in town. Sheriff Estes instructed the assembled group not to get into a direct confrontation with McElroy, but instead seriously consider forming a neighborhood watch program. Estes then drove out of town in his police cruiser. The citizens decided to go to the tavern en masse. The bar soon filled completely.

Death 

After McElroy finished his drinks, he purchased a six pack of beer, left the bar, and entered his pickup truck. Someone shot at McElroy while he was sitting in his truck. He was shot at several times and hit twice, once by a centerfire rifle and once by a .22 rimfire rifle. In all, there were 46 potential witnesses to the shooting, including Trena McElroy, who was in the truck with her husband when he was shot. No one called for an ambulance. Only Trena claimed to identify a gunman; every other witness either was unable to name an assailant or claimed not to have seen who fired the fatal shots. The DA declined to press charges. An extensive federal investigation did not lead to any charges. Missouri-based journalist Steve Booher described the attitude of some townspeople as, "He needed killing."

Aftermath

McElroy was buried at Memorial Park Cemetery in St. Joseph, Missouri. On July 9, 1984, Trena McElroy filed a $5 million wrongful death lawsuit against the Town of Skidmore, County of Nodaway, Sheriff Danny Estes, Steve Peters (Mayor of Skidmore), and Del Clement (whom Trena accused of being the shooter, but who was never charged). The case was later settled out of court by all parties for $17,600, with no one admitting guilt, for the stated reason of avoiding costly legal fees should the suit proceed. Trena remarried and moved to Lebanon, Missouri, where she died of cancer on her 55th birthday on January 24, 2012.

In popular culture
 60 Minutes ran a segment on the story in 1982.
 A 1988 book about McElroy's murder, In Broad Daylight, by Harry N. MacLean, was adapted into the made-for-TV movie In Broad Daylight in 1991 starring Brian Dennehy, Marcia Gay Harden, and Chris Cooper.
 The event was the subject of No One Saw a Thing, a 2019 television documentary mini-series on Sundance TV.

McElroy is believed to be the inspiration for the character Brad Wesley the main antagonist of the 1989 film Road House portrayed by Ben Gazzara.

See also
 List of unsolved murders
 Fuenteovejuna
 Murder of Robert McCartney

References

1934 births
1981 deaths
20th-century American criminals
American male criminals
American murder victims
Crime in Missouri
Criminals from Missouri
Deaths by firearm in Missouri
Male murder victims
Murdered criminals
People from Nodaway County, Missouri
People murdered in Missouri
Place of birth missing
Unsolved murders in the United States
Vigilantism in the United States
 1981 murders in the United States